Abapeba cleonei is a species of spider belonging to the family Corinnidae.

It is native to St. Thomas.

References

Corinnidae
Spiders described in 1926
Spiders of the Caribbean